The Ashuapmushuan Wildlife Reserve is a wildlife reserve in Quebec, Canada, in the watershed of the Ashuapmushuan River.

This area was first visited by "Montagnais" Innu people who practiced the fur trade. With the arrival of Europeans in the area, several trading posts, called Postes du Roi, were established on the shores of lakes Ashuapmushuan and Nicabau. The word Ashuapmushuan is a term in Montagnais Innu language, meaning "where we see the moose".

Access 

It is crossed by the Route 167. This road provides access to the host South station and host Chigoubiche position, respectively located at km 33 and 113.

Territory 

The territory is covered by a pine forest south with hardwood which gradually converts to the north by a forest of black spruce and jack pine.

The forest industry operates Forest Wildlife Reserve Ashuapmushuan under supply and forest management agreements (CAAF) granted by the Ministry of Natural Resources.

Activities and facilities 

In this Wildlife Reserve, eleven cottages located on the shore of Lake Chigoubiche to end rental boaters. Some of these cabins can accommodate two to three people and in the same area, seven cottages are fully equipped to accommodate four to six people. Moreover, the rest area Draveurs, at kilometre 48, has four rustic chalets equipped with a more basic equipment.

On the edge of Lake Dufferin, located a little further south, there is a single cottage for 6 people. Closer Quebec Route 167, an old building caretaker is available for groups up to 8 people. All the cottages are equipped with Wildlife propane equipment. The water is not potable throughout the reserve. Wildlife Reserve makes available to vacationers rowboats and kayaks.

See also 

 List of protected areas of Quebec
 Société des établissements de plein air du Québec (Sépaq)
 List of Canadian provincial parks

References

External links 

 

Protected areas of Saguenay–Lac-Saint-Jean
Protected areas established in 1946